Badminton competitions for The 1974 Asian Games were held in Amjadieh Sport Complex, Tehran, Iran.

Medal summary

Medal table

Medalists

Results

Men's singles

Men's doubles

Women's singles

Women's doubles

Mixed doubles
Final

Bronze medal match

References
https://eresources.nlb.gov.sg/newspapers/Digitised/Article/straitstimes19740914-1.2.147.13
https://eresources.nlb.gov.sg/newspapers/Digitised/Article/straitstimes19740915-1.2.108
https://eresources.nlb.gov.sg/newspapers/Digitised/Article/straitstimes19740916-1.2.109.8.6

External links
Badminton Asia

 
1974 Asian Games events
1974
Asian Games
1974 Asian Games